Nicholas Hagger (born 1939, London) is a British poet, man of letters, cultural historian and commentator, and philosopher. He has been a proponent of philosophical Universalism.

Hagger was educated at Oaklands School in Loughton, Essex and at Chigwell School, Essex, where he read Classics. He attended Worcester College, Oxford, where he read English Literature under Christopher Ricks.

Espionage career
Hagger worked with British Intelligence in the 1960s and early 1970s. He was talent spotted by John Cecil Masterman, provost of Worcester College while Hagger was there. He was interviewed by Charles Woodhouse at MI6's "front office" in 3 Carlton Gardens. In his two volume memoirs, My Double Life he says he declined permanent involvement with MI6, but describes periodic involvement with intelligence assignments spying on Muamar Gaddafi and African national liberation movements such as UNITA, ZANU, ZAPU, and the MPLA.

Academic career
He was sponsored by the British Council as a lecturer at the University of Baghdad, Iraq, from 1961 to 1962 and then at the University of Tokyo (1964 to 1965), Tokyo University of Education (now University of Tsukuba) and Keio University, a combined post (1963 to 1967), where he was also Visiting Foreign Professor. From 1968 to 1970 he was at the University of Libya, Tripoli  He was also tutor to Emperor Hirohito’s second son, Masahito, Prince Hitachi from 1964 until 1967. He wrote for The Times and taught in London. Hagger acquired four schools and set up the Oak-Tree Group of Schools.

Otley Hall
In 1997 he bought Otley Hall in Otley, Suffolk and for seven years ran it as a historic house.

Literary output
Hagger is the author of 57 books, including 2,000 poems and 1,200 short stories. Hagger's philosophical Universalism seeks to reflect the universe as a whole in seven disciplines. His books present the fundamental theme of all world literature  (A New Philosophy of Literature), history (The Rise and Fall of Civilizations), philosophy (The New Philosophy of Universalism, which also covers the sciences), mysticism and religion (The Light of Civilization), international politics and statecraft (World State and World Constitution) and world culture (The Secret American Destiny).

He lives in Essex and now devotes the greater part of his life to writing. In November 2016 Hagger was awarded the Gusi Peace Prize for Literature. In 2019, he also received the Golden Phoenix medal of the Russian Ecological Foundation. He is on the Board of Advisors of the recently established Galileo Commission, which seeks to expand the scope of science.

The University of Essex has Hagger's archive of literary works (manuscripts and papers) on permanent deposit as a Special Collection in the Albert Sloman Library.

Publications

 Scargill the Stalinist?, The Communist Role in the 1984 Miners’ Strike (1984)
 Selected Poems: A Metaphysical’s Way of Fire (1991)
 The Fire and the Stones: A Grand Unified Theory of World History and Religion (1991)
 The Universe and the Light: A New View of the Universe and Reality (1993)
 A Mystic Way: A Spiritual Autobiography (1994)
 Awakening to the Light: Diaries, Volume 1, 1958–1967 (1994)
 Collected Poems: A White Radiance, 1958–1993 (1994)
 A Smell of Leaves and Summer: Collected Stories, Volume 2 (1995)
 A Spade Fresh with Mud, Collected Stories, Volume 1 (1995)
 Overlord: The Triumph of Light, 1944–45, Books 1–2 (1995)
 Overlord: The Triumph of Light, 1944–45, Books 3–6 (1995)
 The Warlords: From D-Day to Berlin, Parts 1 and 2 (1995)
 Overlord: The Triumph of Light, 1944–45, Books 7–9 (1997)
 Overlord: The Triumph of Light, 1944–45, Books 10–12 (1997)
 The One and the Many: Universalism and the Vision of Unity (1999)
 The Tragedy of Prince Tudor: A Nightmare (1999)
 Wheeling Bats and a Harvest Moon: Collected Stories, Volume 3 (1999)
 The Warm Glow of the Monastery Courtyard: Collected Stories, Volume 4 (1999)
 The Syndicate: The Story of the Coming World Government (2004)
 The Secret History of the West: The Influence of Secret Organisations on Western History from the Renaissance to the 20th Century (2005)
 Classical Odes, 1958–2005 (2006)
 Collected Poems, 1958–2005 (2006)
 Overlord: The Triumph of Light, 1944–1945 (2006)
 The Light of Civilization: How the Vision of God has Inspired All the Great Civilizations (2006)
 Collected Stories: A Thousand and One Mini-Stories or Verbal Paintings (2007)
 Collected Verse Plays (2007)
 The Secret Founding of America: The Real Story of Freemasons, Puritans and the Battle for the New World (2007)
 The Last Tourist in Iran, From Persepolis to Nuclear Natanz (2008)
 The Rise and Fall of Civilizations: Why Civilizations Rise and Fall and What Happens When They End (2008)
 The Libyan Revolution: Its Origins and Legacy, A Memoir and Assessment (2009)
 The New Philosophy of Universalism: The Infinite and the Law of Order (2009)
 Armageddon: The Triumph of Universal Order, An Epic Poem on the War on Terror and of Holy-War Crusaders (2010)
 The World Government: A Blueprint for a Universal World State (2010)
 The Secret American Dream: The Creation of a New World Order with the Power to Abolish War, Poverty, and Disease (2011)
 A New Philosophy of Literature: The Fundamental Theme and Unity of World Literature (2012)
 A View of Epping Forest (2012)
 My Double Life 1: This Dark Wood (2015)
 My Double Life 2: A Rainbow over the Hills (2015)
 Selected Poems: Quest for the One (2015)
 Selected Stories: Follies and Vices of the Modern Elizabethan Age (2015)
 The Dream of Europa: The Triumph of Peace (2015)
 Life Cycle and Other New Poems 2006–2016 (2016)
 The First Dazzling Chill of Winter (2016)
 The Secret American Destiny (2016)
 The Secret Founding of America, re-issued (2016)
 Peace for our Time: A Reflection on War and Peace and a Third World War (2018)
 World State: Introduction to the United Federation of the World, How a democratically-elected World Government can replace the UN and bring peace (2018)
 World Constitution: Constitution for the United Federation of the World (2018)
 King Charles the Wise (2018)
 Visions of England (2019)
 Fools’ Paradise (2020)
 Selected Letters (2021)
 The Coronation of King Charles (2021)
 Collected Prefaces (2022)
 Fools’ Gold (2022)
 The Promised Land (2023)
 The Algorithm of Creation (2023)

References

Living people
1939 births
British writers
People from Essex
Secret Intelligence Service personnel